Havalina Rail Co. or just Havalina was a rock band from Long Beach, California. Many of Havalina's releases were regional concept albums.

According to the band's website, the band's name was inspired by the song "Havalina" by the Pixies. Havalina was active from 1992 through 2005.  Havalina played their last show on March 17, 2005 at The Gypsy Lounge. Former members of Havalina are now involved in Matt Death and the New Intellectuals, Os and the Oculist, Starmob and Wargirl.

History
The group was founded in Long Beach, California in 1992.

Havalina Rail Co. released their self-titled debut album through Tooth & Nail Records in 1994. The album contains 19 tracks of rockabilly, folk, swing and zydeco. This was the only album released by the band that wasn't a concept album. In an interview for KPSU, Wignall commented that the first album was "this sort of finding our path and gravitating towards American sounds."

Their second album, The Diamond in the Fish, released in 1996, was a concept album telling the story of a retired secret agent. The album was filled with Rat Pack-style jazz, filtered through folk and blues. About Diamond in the Fish, Wignall said, "We were experimenting with idea of like playing jazz, which incidentally, we kinda sucked at. And found out why most of the time all good jazz players are over fifty, 'cause it takes that long to get good at it."

The band independently released Russian Lullabies through Wignall's Jackson/Rubio label. This was the band's attempt to produce Eastern European music without actually listening to Eastern European music, then making a pop music sound from that. The album is long out of print, however, Wignall uploaded the album to the band's website for free download.

Wignall described  America as "a musical road trip around America with the idea being to show our influences and what we like about American music while kinda re-defining the ideas if we had been there and done it our own way".  The track "Let's Not Forget Hawaii" from this recording was featured on MTV's The Real World for the Hawaii season closer.

Space Love & Bullfighting (2002) was Havalina's final release with Tooth & Nail Records. This is the first album released under the name Havalina and not "Havalina Rail Co."  Wignall described this album as songs about space, love, and bullfighting and various combinations of those themes. Song from this album were played on MTV's Sorority Life.

Personnel
Though the lineup changed frequently, Matt Wignall and Orlando Greenhill were consistent members.

 Matt Wignall – guitar, banjo, primary vocals
 Orlando Greenhill – upright bass, bass guitar, vocals
 Jeff Suri – Drums, piano, vocals
 Grady McFerrin – trumpet, washboard
 Mark Cole – percussion, extra noises
 Daniel J. Brooker – accordion, piano
 Nathan Jensen - saxophone, vocals
 Lori Hoopes-Suri - percussion, vocals
 Tatiana Simonian – farfisa, vocals
 Mercedes Stevens/starry dynamo – vocals, guitar, cello
 David Maust – Farfisa, Moog synthesizer, Wurlitzer, organ, accordion, hurdy-gurdy
 Erick Nieto – drums, violin

Discography

Studio albums
 Havalina Rail Co.
 The Diamond in the Fish
 Russian Lullabies
 America
 Space, Love, & Bullfighting
 We Remember Anarchy

Extended plays
 A Bullfighter's Guide to Space and Love

Compilations
 Sweet Family Music: A Tribute to Stryper (1996) - Contains "Always There for You"
 Surfonic Water Revival (1998) - Contains "The Sun Comes Down Again" (Taylor) – with Randy Stonehill
 Jackson/Rubio's Rockabilly Western Gospel Hymns - Contains "Train 13"

Other releases
Havalina and the Creaky Old Bridge (Video)

References

 KPSU interview of Matt Wignall by Dave Cusick

External links
 Matt Wignall's Photography
 Interview @ In Music We Trust.com
 Interview @ The Phantom Tollbooth.

Indie rock musical groups from California
Tooth & Nail Records artists
Musical groups established in 1994
1994 establishments in California